Coppell may refer to:

 Coppell, Ontario
 Coppell, Texas
 Coppell High School
 Harry Coppell (born 1996), English pole vaulter
 Steve Coppell (born 1955), English football manager

See also
 Coppel, department store
 Coppel (surname)
 Koppel (disambiguation)